A Goth is a member of the Goths, a group of East Germanic tribes. Two major political entities of the Goths were:
Visigoths, prominent in Spanish history
Ostrogoths, prominent in Italian history

Goth or Goths may also refer to:

Goth (surname)
Gothic rock or just goth, a music genre
Goth subculture
Goth (novel), a 2003 Japanese novel by Otsuichi
Goth (Silverwing), a character in the Silverwing series
Goth (village), a word meaning village in Sindhi
Goths (album), by the Mountain Goats
The Goth, nickname of Thoby Stephen
Goth (2008 film), a Japanese drama film
Goth (2003 film), an American horror film
A nickname for Gothenburg Public House System and the bars which are part of them, especially in Scotland

See also
Gothic (disambiguation)
Gotra, South Asian clan system, pronounced in Urdu as goth